John Hoffman was acting attorney general of the State of New Jersey. He served from 2013 to 2016, longer than any other acting attorney general in the state's history.

Background
Hoffman was born August 23, 1965, to Judith and John A. Hoffman. Hoffman married Mary Jude Cox December 6, 2003. Their fathers, Stuart T. Cox and John A. Hoffman, worked together as partners of the law firm Wilentz, Goldman & Spitzer in Woodbridge Township, New Jersey.

Tenure as acting attorney general
He ascended to the position when Attorney General Jeffrey Chiesa resigned on June 6, 2013, after Governor Chris Christie announced that he would appoint Chiesa to succeed recently deceased United States Senator Frank Lautenberg. He is an independent and attended Colgate University before earning his law degree at Duke University.

Hoffman resigned as acting attorney general in March 2016 and became the general counsel of Rutgers University.

References

1965 births
Colgate University alumni
Duke University School of Law alumni
Living people
New Jersey Attorneys General